Qazi Athar Mubarakpuri (7 May 1916 – 14 July 1996) was an Indian Sunni Islamic scholar, author and historian. He was honoured with the title of Muhsin-e-Hind by Pakistani scholars.

Biography
Mubarakpuri was born on 7 May 1916 in Mubarakpur, Azamgarh. He is part of the ethnic Rohilla community. He graduated in dars-e-nizami from Madrasa Ehya-ul-Uloom and moved to Madrasa Shahi, Moradabad to study ahadith. In Shahi, he studied Sahih Bukhari with Syed Fakhruddin Ahmad, Sahih Muslim with Ismail Sambhali, and Jami' al-Tirmidhi with Muhammad Miyan Deobandi.

Mubarakpuri died on 14 July 1996. His funeral prayer was led by Abul Qasim Nomani.

Literary works
Mubarakpuri wrote books on the relation of Indians and Arabs. In this series his books include Arb-o-Hind Ahd-e-Risalat Mai, Khilafat-e-Rashida awr Hindustan, Khilafat Amwiyyah awr Hindustan, Khilafat Abbasiyah awr Hindustan and Hindustan mai Arbon ki hukumatein.

Legacy
Contribution Of Qazi Athar Mubarakpuri to Arabic Studies : A Critical Study - PhD thesis from Aligarh Muslim University by Mohd Amirul Hasan.
His son Khalid Hafiz (1938–1999), Imam of Wellington, served as the senior religious advisor to the New Zealand Muslim community from 1982 to 1999.

See also
 List of Indian writers

References 

1916 births
1996 deaths
Writers from Uttar Pradesh
20th-century Indian Muslims
People from Azamgarh district
Urdu-language writers from India
Deobandis
Indian Sunni Muslim scholars of Islam
Madrasa Shahi alumni
Students of Muhammad Miyan Deobandi